Irshansk (translit. Irshans’k) is an urban-type settlement in Korosten Raion, Zhytomyr Oblast, Ukraine. Population: .

Irshansk is (with Vilnohirsk) the centre of the Ukrainian titanium ore industry.

History

Demographics 
According to the 2001 census, the population of Irshansk was 6,312.

Languages spoken natively by residents are:

 88.24% — Ukrainian
 11.33% — Russian
 0.13% — Belarusian
 0.02% — Bulgarian
 0.02% — Romanian
 0.02% — Moldovan
 0.02% — Polish

Government

References

Urban-type settlements in Korosten Raion
Korosten Raion